Christening may refer to:

 Baptism, a Christian sacrament of admission and adoption
 Infant baptism, the practice of baptising infants or young children
 Christening, an example of a naming ceremony, practiced by Christians and often involving a baptism 
 Christening, naming of a vessel, as in ceremonial ship launching
 Anointing, the ritual act of putting aromatic oil on a person

Other uses
 "Christening" (The Office), an episode of the US version of The Office
 The Christening, a 2010 Polish drama film

See also 
 Christen (disambiguation)

Christian terminology